A Massachusetts general election was held on November 8, 1960 in the Commonwealth of Massachusetts.

The election included:
 statewide elections for United States Senator, Governor, Lieutenant Governor, Attorney General, Secretary of the Commonwealth, Treasurer, and Auditor;
 district elections for U.S. Representatives, State Representatives, State Senators, and Governor's Councillors; and
 ballot questions at the state and local levels.

Democratic and Republican candidates were selected in party primaries held on September 13, 1960.

Governor

Republican John A. Volpe was elected over Democrat Joseph D. Ward, Socialist Labor candidate Henning A. Blomen, and Prohibition candidate Guy S. Williams.

Lieutenant Governor

Democrat Edward F. McLaughlin Jr. was elected Lieutenant Governor over Republican Augustus Gardner Means, Socialist Labor candidate Francis A. Votano, and Prohibition candidate Thomas Maratea. This is the last time that a Lieutenant Governor would not be from the same party as the Governor.

Democratic primary

Candidates
Pasquale Caggiano, perennial candidate
Edward F. McLaughlin Jr., Boston City Council President

Results

Republican primary

Candidates
Augustus Gardner Means, member of the Massachusetts Governor's Council

Results
Means was unopposed for the Republican nomination.

General election

Lieutenant Governor

Attorney General

Incumbent Attorney General Edward J. McCormack, Jr. defeated Republican George Michaels, Socialist Workers candidate August Johnson, and Prohibition candidate William D. Ross.

General election

Results

Secretary of the Commonwealth

Incumbent Secretary of the Commonwealth Joseph D. Ward did not run for re-election as he instead ran for Governor.

Kevin White defeated Francis X. Ahearn and Margaret McGovern in the Democratic primary.

The Republicans nominated Edward Brooke, who became the first African-American to be nominated for Massachusetts statewide office by a major party.

White defeated Brooke, Socialist Labor candidate Fred M. Ingersoll, and Prohibition candidate Julia Kohler in the general election.

Democratic primary

Candidates
Francis X. Ahearn, former President of the Boston City Council
Margaret McGovern, attorney
Kevin White, attorney and son of Joseph C. White

Results

General election

Treasurer and Receiver-General

Incumbent Treasurer and Receiver-General John Francis Kennedy did not run for re-election as he instead ran for Governor. 

In the Democratic primary, John T. Driscoll defeated Patrick F. McDonough, John B. Kennedy, George F. Hurley, John M. Kennedy, and Robert J. Sullivan.

Walter J. Trybulski defeated Francis Andrew Walsh for the Republican nomination.

Driscoll defeated Trybulski, Socialist Labor candidate Domenico DiGirolamo, and Prohibition candidate Warren Carberg in the general election.

Democratic primary

Candidates
John T. Driscoll, State Representative
George F. Hurley
John B. Kennedy, Saugus Town Manager
John M. Kennedy
Patrick F. McDonough, member of the Boston City Council
Robert J. Sullivan

Results

Republican primary

Candidates
Walter J. Trybulski, former Mayor of Chicopee
Francis Andrew Walsh

Results

General election

Auditor

Incumbent Auditor Thomas J. Buckley defeated John Hynes in the Democratic primary and Republican Gardner Wardwell, Socialist Labor candidate Arne Sortell, and Prohibition candidate John B. Lauder in the general election.

Democratic primary

Candidates
Thomas J. Buckley, incumbent Auditor
John Hynes

Results

General election

United States Senator

Republican Leverett Saltonstall was re-elected over Democrat Thomas J. O'Connor, Socialist Labor candidate Lawrence Gilfedder, and Prohibition candidate Mark R. Shaw.

See also
 162nd Massachusetts General Court (1961–1962)

References

 
Massachusetts